FORREC Ltd. (customarily styled FORREC) designs and plans theme parks, water parks, resorts, retail and mixed use developments and visitor attractions around the world. FORREC's clients include Universal Studios, LEGOLAND, Nickelodeon, BBC Worldwide and Six Flags as well as international companies like China's Wanda Group and Chimelong Group, Dubai Holdings, Dubai Parks & Resorts, Meraas Leisure and Entertainment LLC, Singapore Tourism Board and Khazanah Nasional Berhad. FORREC began as a landscape architecture firm in Canada in 1984 and has since added architecture, interior design and graphics disciplines.

Company history

Pre-FORREC

1961-1965: Sasaki, Strong & Associates 
Japanese-American landscape architect, Hideo Sasaki partnered with Richard Strong to form the Toronto-based firm Sasaki, Stong and Associates in 1961. Working mainly in Canada, they master planned Toronto's Queen's Park Complex and designed Nathan Philips Square.

1965-1970: Richard Strong Associates Ltd. 
Richard Strong founded Richard Strong Associates in 1965, but continued to partner with Hideo Sasaki on numerous projects. Together they designed La Ronde, the amusement park for Expo 67 in Montreal.

1970-1973: Merged to form Strong Moorhead Sigsby, Ltd. 
Merging with Australian landscape architecture professor, Donald Guy Sigsby, and Toronto-based landscape architect Steven Moorhead, Richard Strong became president of Strong Moorhead Sigsby, Ltd. The firm expanded, with offices in Toronto and Sydney, Australia. As Strong Moorhead Sigsby Limited the group published numerous academic articles and studies, as well as the following books:
 Gros Morne National Park, Newfoundland, Atlantic Region (1971)
 Fathom Five Provincial Park (1973)

1973-1977: Name Change to Richard Strong - Steven Moorhead 
Upon Sigsby's departure to start his own firm in Australia, a partnership formed between Strong and Moorhead. Most of the work from these 5 years was based in Ontario. During this time the company focused on urban renewal, recreational land planning, and landscape design for urban parks, like Devonian Square in downtown Toronto. One of their largest projects was The Thunder Bay Waterfront Park Study plan. This 28-page report was well received and was used as the basis of development for years to come. The pair continued to produce industry related books and articles, including: 
 Ryerson Polytechnical Institute: Landscape Development (1975)

1977-1984: Moorhead Fleming Corban Inc. then Moorhead, Fleming, Corban, and McCarthy 
Strong moved to Calgary, Alberta in 1977 and established his practice there as Richard Strong Associates. A series of employee promotions and company mergers adjusted the name and management make-up of the company for almost a decade. In 1978, the firm designed Canada's Wonderland, the country's first major theme park and later, in 1981, the World Water Park at West Edmonton Mall.

As FORREC 
The increase of theme park and water park focused work led to the company's final name change in 1985 to FORREC, a shortened version of "For recreation". The company's business model also became a private limited with share capital. To keep ownership fluid, a policy was created that required shareholders to begin selling their shares at age 60.

1985-1992: A North-American focus 
FORREC were hired by USAA Real Estate Company, a subsidiary of the USAA insurance company, and Gaylord Entertainment Company, a company which owned Opryland USA, to assist in the design of a theme park in San Antonio, at the time known as Fiesta Texas. Soon after, Universal Studios hired FORREC to design their theme park in Florida, which opened in 1990.

1992-2013: Global projects 
FORREC began doing more international work. They were hired to transform the Beijing National Aquatics Center from the 2008 summer Olympics into a family water park called the Happy Magic Watercube. BBC Worldwide asked FORREC to create a series of prototypes for four of their most famous brands – Top Gear, CBeebies, BBC Earth and Walking with Dinosaurs.

2013-Present: Continued growth and mergers 
In 2013, Tim Scott and Nolan Natale of Natale and Scott Architects (NASA), joined FORREC, along with their entire team. This addition makes FORREC a fully licensed architectural practice in Ontario.

FORREC merged with Scott Torrance Landscape Architect Inc (STLA) in 2016 to extend local expertise in landscape architecture.

Selected Projects

Theme parks 
 Canada's Wonderland, Vaughn, Ontario, Canada
 Dollywood, Pigeon Forge, Tennessee, United States
 Everland Theme Park, Seoul, Korea
 F1-X Theme Park, Dubai, UAE
 LEGOLAND Deutschland, Gunzburg, Germany
 MOI Park, Istanbul, Turkey
 Nickelodeon Universe, Bloomington, Minnesota, United States
 Ontario Place, Toronto, Ontario, Canada
 Oriental Imperial Valley Theme Park, Xi'an, Shaanxi, China
 Playland
 Six Flags Dubai, Dubai, UAE
 Universal Studios, Orlando, Florida, USA
 Wanda Nanchang Outdoor Theme Park, Nanchang, China
 Wanda Xishuangbanna International Resort, Xishuangbanna, China

Water parks 
 Caribbean Bay Everland Resort, Seoul, Korea
 Center Parcs Domaine des Trois Forets, Moselle, France
 Costa Caribe, PortAventura World, Tarragona, Spain
 Dawang Deep Pit Water World, Changsha China
 Happy Magic Watercube, Beijing, China
 Lotte World Kimhae Water Park, Kimhae, Korea
 Nickelodeon Family Suites Resort Water Park, Lake Buena Vista, Florida, United States
 NRH2O, North Richland Hills, Texas, United States
 Senbo Green Park Resort, China
 Wanda Xishuangbanna Water Park, Xishuangbanna, China
 West Edmonton Mall, World Water Park, Edmonton, Alberta, Canada

Mixed use developments 
 Annapurna Studios, Hyderabad, India
 Azerbaijan Dream Land Plaza, Baku, Azerbaijan
 Circus City, Zhengding, China
 Dubai Wonderland, Dubai, UAE
 Fortune Bay Tourism City, Hengqin Island, China
 Garden City, Wa Fang Dian, China
 Grand Galaxy Mall, Jakarta, Indonesia
 Marina Walk, Herzila, Israel
 Qingdao International Tourist City, Qingdao, China
 Thanh Xuan Park, Hanoi, Vietnam
 Wasaga Beach, Ontario, Canada 
 Wave City Centre, Noida, India

Other 
 Dreamland, Cairo, Egypt
 Longleat Safari and Adventure Park, Warminster, United Kingdom
 St. Elizabeth Village, Hamilton, Ontario, Canada

Awards

2017 
 Architecture in Perspective 32
 Observational Award of Excellence to Ashley Thomas
 Rendering Award of Excellence to Autumn Kwon

2016 
 Architecture in Perspective 31 from the American Society of Architectural Illustrators
 Taidgh McClory Rendering Juror Award to Gary Chan
Aquatics International Dream Design for Wanda Xishuangbanna International Resort Water Park

2015 
 Architecture in Perspective 30
 Award of Excellence to Michael Mills for Hungarian House of Music, Budapest 
 Thomas Payne Juror's Award to Anthony Chieh for Tower Concept, Guiyang 
 Richard Johnson Juror's Award to Steve Thorington for Ocean Cottage

2014 
 Order of da Vinci Award to FORREC Creative Director, Gordon Grice from the Ontario Association of Architects - Recognizing architects who have demonstrated exceptional leadership in the profession, education and/or in the community

2013 
 Excellence in Planning Award: Research and New Directions for Step Forward Pedestrian Mobility Plan, City of Hamilton from the Ontario Professional Planners Institute
 Excellence in Planning Award: Healthy Communities for Step Forward Pedestrian Mobility Plan, City of Hamilton from the Ontario Professional Planners Institute
 Dream Design: Waterpark Renovation Honor for Happy Magic Watercube, Beijing from Aquatics International
 Architecture in Perspective 28
 Award of Excellence to Danny Drapiza for Thanh Xuan Park
 Award of Excellence to Steve Thorington for Powerlong City Plaza
 Award of Excellence to Jan Jurgensen for Verdant Avenue

2012 
 Architecture in Perspective 27
 Award of Excellence to Juhn Pena for 1001 Cities

2011 
 Planning Excellence Award: Innovation in Sustaining Places for Confederation Park Master Plan Review and Update from American Planning Association, New York Upstate Chapter - Recognizing plans that demonstrate how sustainability practices are being used in how places are planned, designed, built, used, and maintained at all scales
 Architecture in Perspective 26
 Award of Excellence for two Wanda Dalian Illustrations

2010 
 Industry Innovation Award for Centre Parcs Aquamundo, Moselle, France, from The World Waterpark Association
 Industry Innovation Award for Happy Magic Watercube, Beijing, from The World Waterpark Association

External links
 Official website

References

Canadian companies established in 1985
Companies based in Toronto
Design companies of Canada
Entertainment companies of Canada
Amusement park companies
 
Museum companies
Architecture firms of Canada
Landscape architecture
Canadian landscape architects
Interior design firms
Consulting firms established in 1985
Engineering consulting firms of Canada